Spulerina parthenocissi is a moth of the family Gracillariidae. It is known from the islands of Hokkaidō, Honshū and Shikoku in Japan.

The wingspan is 6–8 mm.

The larvae feed on Parthenocissus tricuspidata. They mine the leaves of their host plant. The mines commonly occur on both the upper and lower sides of the leaves.

References

Spulerina
Moths of Japan
Moths described in 1988